Nikolaos Karathanasopoulos (born 25 March 1963), is a Greek politician. He has served as a member of the Hellenic Parliament since 2007, representing Achaia for the Communist Party of Greece

Background
Karathanasopoulos is an economist by profession. He is fluent in Italian. He is a member of the Central Leadership of the Economic Chamber of Greece.

References 

Living people
1963 births
Politicians from Athens
Communist Party of Greece politicians
Greek MPs 2007–2009
Greek MPs 2009–2012
Greek MPs 2012 (May)
Greek MPs 2012–2014
Greek MPs 2015 (February–August)
20th-century Greek economists
Greek MPs 2015–2019
Greek MPs 2019–2023